Véronique Genest (born Véronique Combouilhaud, 26 June 1956) is a French actress. She is best known for her starring role as Commissaire Julie Lescaut in the French police drama series Julie Lescaut which ran from 1992–2013.

Filmography

Film 
 1980 : La Banquière (English Title: The Lady Banker)
 1982 : Guy de Maupassant : Fanny
 1982 : Légitime violence : Lucie Kasler
 1983 : Il quartetto Basileus (Italian/French Collaboration) : Sophia
 1983 : J'ai épousé une ombre : Patricia Meyrand
 1983 : Debout les crabes, la mer monte ! : Marthe
 1984 : Tango
 1985 : La Baston : Denise Levasseur
 1985 : Ça n'arrive qu'à moi : Prudence
 1986 : Suivez mon regard (English Title: Follow My Gaze) : Une fille délurée
 1986 : Triple sec (Short)
 1986 : Chère canaille : Frédérique Henriot
 1987 : Association de malfaiteurs (English Title: Association of Wrongdoers) : Monique Lemercier
 1987 : Strike (Short)
 1989 : Un père et passe : Marianne
 1990 : Le grand ruban : Sylvie
 1991 : On peut toujours rêver (English Title: One Can Always Dream) : La prostituée mélomane
 1991 : Les secrets professionnels du Dr Apfelglück (English Title: The Professional Secrets of Dr. Apfelgluck) : Micheline
 1992 : Et demain ... Hollywood ! : Marie Bluchet
 1997 : Droit dans le mur  (English Title: Straight into the Wall) : Myriam

Television 
 1981 : Nana (TV Mini-Series) – (four episodes) : Nana
 1983 : Le ambizioni sbagliate (Italian TV Movie) : Andreina
 1983 : Péchés originaux (TV Mini-Series) – (Season 1 Episode 5, Adam et Ève) : Lydie
 1984 : Emportez-la avec vous (TV Movie) : Myriam
 1986–1991 : Série noire (TV Series) – (Season 1, Episode 20,37) : Marlène/Lucien
 1988 : Sueurs froides (TV Series) – (Season 1, Episode 1, Le chat et la souris) : Valérie Vétheuil
 1989 : Une femme tranquille (TV Movie) : Véronique
 1989 : L'été de tous les chagrins (TV Movie) : Ginette
 1989 : Les sirènes de minuit (TV Movie) : Maud
 1989 : David Lansky (TV Series) (Season 1 Episode 3, Le gang des limousines) : Yasmine Sublet
 1989 : Une table pour six (TV Movie) : Corinne
 1990 : V comme vengeance (TV Series) – (Episode 14, Une table pour six) : Corinne
 1990 : Mit den Clowns kamen die Tränen (German TV Mini-Series) : Francine Renaud
 1992 : Ma tu mi vuoi bene? (Italian TV Movie) : Livia
 1992 : Secret de famille (TV Mini-Series) : Marthe
 1992–2013 : Julie Lescaut (TV Series) – (Seasons 1-23) : Commissaire Julie Lescaut
 1996 : Sixième classique (TV Movie) : Simone
 1998 : Un amour de cousine (TV Movie) : Lucille
 2000 : On n'est pas là pour s'aimer (TV Movie) : Frédérique Letheil
 2003 : Une femme si parfaite (TV Movie) : Anne Joubert
 2006 : Un transat pour huit (TV Movie) : Florence
 2007 : La dame d'Izieu (TV Mini-Series) : Sabine Zlatin
 2011 : Merci patron! (English Title: Who's the Boss Now?) (TV Movie) : Hélène Scoffie
 2014 : La disparue du Pyla (TV Movie) : Carole Castel

Awards 
 2004 : Decorated with the Légion d'honneur by French president Jacques Chirac.

References

External links 

 
  Véronique Genest on AlloCiné

1956 births
Living people
People from Meaux
French film actresses
French television actresses
20th-century French actresses
Recipients of the Legion of Honour
21st-century French actresses